Cyril Granon (born February 21, 1972 in Aix-en-Provence) is a French professional football coach and a former player.

Granon captained the AC Ajaccio side that were Division 2 champions in 2002.

References

External links

1972 births
Living people
French footballers
French football managers
French expatriate footballers
Expatriate footballers in Spain
AS Monaco FC players
FC Lorient players
FC Mulhouse players
AC Ajaccio players
Racing de Ferrol footballers
Association football midfielders
Pays d'Aix FC players
Pays d'Aix FC managers